Matthew E. Ziegler  (1897–1981) was an American artist associated with the American regionalist style. He painted the New Deal mural Wheat in the Shock in the Flandreau, South Dakota, post office. It was commissioned by the United States Department of the Treasury.

Biography
Ziegler was born on February 4, 1897, in Ste. Genevieve, Missouri. He was the nephew of the portrait painter Sister Cassiana Marie who encouraged him to paint.  

In the 1930s he was associated with the Ste. Genevieve Art Colony in Ste. Genevieve, Missouri. He owned the rooming house where the three founders of the colony,  Aimee Schweig, Bernard E. Peters, and Jessie Beard Rickly, rented space. Ziegler associated with the artists in the colony, particularly Peters with whom he became friends. Ziegler was interested in photography and used photographs to help compose his paintings as well as a way of documenting rural life in Ste. Genevieve and photographing the artist of the colony.  

Ziegler won the commission for a mural for the Flandreau, South Dakota Post Office. He produced an oil on canvas mural entitled Wheat in the Shock which was installed in 1940. The mural was a winner in the 48-State Post Office Mural Competition.

Ziegler died on October 6, 1981, in Ste. Genevieve. His work is in the collection of the Smithsonian American Art Museum.

References

External links
images of Ziegler's work on Invaluable

1897 births
1981 deaths
Artists from Missouri
American male artists